The bluemouth cichlid  (Wajpamheros nourissati) is a species of cichlid fish that is endemic to the Usumacinta River basin in southern Mexico and Guatemala, where it is widely distributed in rivers, creeks and lakes. This species is the only known member of its genus. The specific name honours the French cichlid specialist Jean Claude Nourissat (1942-2003), who collected type of this species.

References

Heroini
Monotypic fish genera
Fish described in 1989